The Paraíba River may refer to three rivers in Brazil:

Paraíba do Norte River, in Paraíba state of northeastern Brazil
Paraíba do Meio River, in Alagoas state of northeastern Brazil
Paraíba do Sul River, in São Paulo and Rio de Janeiro states of southeastern Brazil

See also
Paraíba (disambiguation)